The Roaring West is a 1935 American Western film serial starring Buck Jones as Montana Larkin. It co-stars his horse, Silver, and Frank McGlynn Sr. as his trusty sidekick Jinglebob Morgan. The film was released by Universal.

Plot

Cast
 Buck Jones as Montana Larkin
 Silver as Silver, Montana's horse
 Muriel Evans as Mary Parker
 Frank McGlynn Sr. as Jinglebob Morgan
 Walter Miller as Gil Gillespie
 Eole Galli as Ann Hardy
 Harlan Knight as Clem Morgan
 Fred Santley as a saloon singer
 William Desmond as Jim Parker
 Pat J. O'Brien as Cowhand Steve
 Tiny Skelton as Cowhand Happy
 Charles King as Henchman Tex
 William L. Thorne as Marco Brett
 George Ovey as Cowhand Shorty
 Dick Rush as Sheriff Clark

Production

Stunts
 Cliff Lyons doubling Buck Jones
 Babe DeFreest
 Wally West

Chapter titles
 The Land Rush
 The Torrent of Terror
 Flaming Peril
 Stampede of Death
 Danger in the Dark
 Death Rides the Plains
 Hurled to the Depths
 Ravaging Flames
 Death Holds the Reins
 The Fatal Blast
 The Baited Trap
 The Mystery Shot
 Flaming Torrents
 Thundering Fury
 The Conquering Cowpokes
Source:

See also
 List of film serials
 List of film serials by studio

References

External links

1935 films
American black-and-white films
1930s English-language films
Universal Pictures film serials
Films directed by Ray Taylor
1935 Western (genre) films
American Western (genre) films
Films with screenplays by George H. Plympton
1930s American films